Quebecor Media Inc. is a Canadian media conglomerate that owns a wide array of media outlets, as well as an internet service provider.

History 
In 1983 Quebecor purchased the Winnipeg Sun newspaper, which had been independently run. The newspaper was later sold to the Postmedia chain.

In August 2000, Quebecor Media bought Vidéotron for CA$4.9 billion. In May 2001, the Canadian Radio-television and Telecommunications Commission (CRTC) approved the transfer of broadcasting licenses from Vidéotron to Quebecor Media. Also in 2001, Quebecor Media bought Groupe TVA.

As of June 2018, Quebecor Inc. fully owns Quebecor Media, while CDP Capital d’Amérique Investissements Inc. (a subsidiary of Caisse de dépôt et placement du Québec, the provincial pension fund) previously owned an 18.9% share. On May 8, 2018, Quebecor had announced its intent to buy out the remainder of the Caisse's stake for $1.69 billion in cash and stock.

Assets
 Groupe TVA (broadcasting, publishing & production)
 Canoe Inc. (internet websites including Canoe.ca/Canoe.com portal and Archambault.ca)
 Vidéotron (cellular, cable television and internet service provider)
 MediaPages (print and online directories)
 TVA Publishing Inc. (largest magazine publishing company in Quebec)
 Quebecor Media Book Group (book publishing companies)
 Distribution Select (distributor of CDs and videos)
 Le SuperClub Vidéotron (Movie rental stores)
 Gestion Studios Bloobuzz S. E. C (a video games publisher)
 QMI press agency (news agency)

Corporate governance
 Pierre Karl Péladeau, President and CEO

Board of directors:
 Pierre Dion, Chairman
 Jean La Couture, Vice Chairman

See also

 Torstar
 Metroland Media Group
 Star Media Group
 Postmedia Network
The Woodbridge Company and CTVglobemedia

References

External links
 Official website
 CRTC chart of Quebecor Media Inc.'s assets (PDF)

Quebecor
Mass media companies established in 2000
Canadian companies established in 2000
2000 establishments in Quebec
Newspaper companies of Canada
Companies based in Montreal